Persicula interruptolineata is a species of sea snail, a marine gastropod mollusk, in the family Cystiscidae.

References

interruptolineata
Gastropods described in 1816
Cystiscidae